The men's team pursuit speed skating competition of the 2018 Winter Olympics was held on 18 and 21 February 2018 at Gangneung Oval in Gangneung

Records
Prior to this competition, the existing world, Olympic and track records were as follows.

The following records were set during this competition.

Results

Quarterfinals
Although these races are called quarterfinals, no direct elimination is used but the teams are ranked by time, with the top four teams progressing to the semifinals.

The quarterfinals were held on 18 February at 20:00.

TR = track record

Semifinals
The semifinals were held on 21 February at 20:22.

Finals
The finals were held on 21 February at 21:13.

References

Men's speed skating at the 2018 Winter Olympics